The men's 100 metre freestyle event at the 2014 Asian Games took place on 25 September 2014 at Munhak Park Tae-hwan Aquatics Center.

Schedule
All times are Korea Standard Time (UTC+09:00)

Records

Results
Legend
DNS — Did not start

Heats

Final

 Park Tae-hwan of South Korea originally won the silver medal, but was later disqualified after he tested positive for Nebido.

References

Heats Results
Final Results

External links
Official website

Swimming at the 2014 Asian Games